Useldange is a commune and small town in western Luxembourg, in the canton of Redange.

, the town of Useldange, which lies in the east of the commune, has a population of 1965.  Other towns within the commune include Everlange, Rippweiler, and Schandel.

Useldange Castle is a medieval castle, which, while now being mainly in ruin, also comprises the current town hall. It is located in the centre of the village, right opposite to the town's church building. The site can be visited throughout the year with special arrangements for poorly sighted visitors. It is also the location for the annual medieval festival in Luxembourg.

Useldange also has an airfield used by gliders.

Population

References

External links
 

Communes in Redange (canton)
Towns in Luxembourg